Jack D. Rule Jr. (born November 13, 1938) is an American professional golfer who played on the PGA Tour in the 1960s.

Life
Rule was born in Mason City, Iowa and grew up in Waterloo, Iowa. He defeated Jack Nicklaus in the 1956 U.S. Junior Amateur semi-finals but lost to Harlan Stevenson in the finals. He graduated from the University of Iowa and turned professional in 1961.

Rule won twice on the PGA Tour, the 1963 St. Paul Open Invitational and the 1965 Oklahoma City Open Invitational. His best finish in a major was T39 at the 1964 PGA Championship.

Rule played sparingly on the Champions Tour from 1989 to 2001, mostly in the U.S. Senior Open.

In 1993, Rule was inducted into the Iowa Golf Hall of Fame .

Amateur wins
1956 National Jaycee Tournament
1958 Waterloo Open Amateur Tournament, Iowa Amateur, Western Junior
1959 Waterloo Open Amateur Tournament, Iowa Amateur

Professional wins (5)

PGA Tour wins (2)

Other wins (3)
1966 Haig & Haig Scotch Foursome (with Sandra Spuzich)
1969 Waterloo Open Golf Classic
1974 Waterloo Open Golf Classic

References

External links

American male golfers
PGA Tour golfers
Golfers from Iowa
University of Iowa alumni
People from Mason City, Iowa
Sportspeople from Waterloo, Iowa
1938 births
Living people